Dance Me Outside is a collection of short stories written by W. P. Kinsella in 1977.

The book contains seventeen stories narrated by Silas Ermineskin and is set on a Cree Indian reserve in Central Alberta and is about what happens in the lives of the people that live on the reserve.

Film and television adaptions
In 1995, Bruce McDonald directed the film Dance Me Outside starring Ryan Black, Hugh Dillon, and Adam Beach, an adaption of the book by Kinsella. A year later in 1996, the television show The Rez was first aired, which was also an adaption of the book by Kinsella.

References 

1977 short story collections
American short story collections